Mangelia vesta is a species of sea snail, a marine gastropod mollusc in the family Mangeliidae.

Description

Distribution
This marine species occurs off Western Sumatra, Indonesia.

References

 J. Thiele, 1925. Gastropoden der Deutschen Tiefsee-Expedition. In:. Wissenschaftliche Ergebnisse der Deutschen Tiefsee-Expedition II. Teil, vol. 17, No. 2, Gutstav Fischer, Berlin.

External links
  Tucker, J.K. 2004 Catalog of recent and fossil turrids (Mollusca: Gastropoda). Zootaxa 682:1–1295.

vesta
Gastropods described in 1925